Thermonotus apicalis is a species of beetle in the family Cerambycidae. It was described by Ritsema in 1881. It is known from Sumatra and Java. It contains the varietas Thermonotus apicalis var. oberthueri.

References

Lamiini
Beetles described in 1881